Santiam Academy was an early primary and secondary school in Lebanon, Oregon, United States, run by the Methodist Episcopal Church.

History
The predecessor of the school was founded by pioneers in 1852 in a log cabin. Santiam Academy was created on January 18, 1854, by an act of the Oregon Territorial Legislature, and a larger building was constructed between 1854 and 1856. Among the members of the first board of trustees were Delazon Smith and David W. Ballard.

Attendance at the school dropped after the establishment of a public school district in 1870, and the academy shut down during the 1903–1904 school year. The church then turned the property over to the Lebanon School District. The building was torn down in the 1930s, and in 1945 Santiam School was built on the site, across from Lebanon High School. Santiam School closed in 1982 and was torn down in 2002. The site is now a Lebanon city park.

Notable alumni
Owen Nickerson Denny, judge, United States consul general to China, introduced the ring-necked pheasant to the U.S.
Melvin Clark George, U.S. Representative

Notable administrators and faculty
William Holman Odell, Surveyor General of Oregon, editor of the Statesman Journal, namesake of Odell Lake

See also
Bethel College
Tualatin Academy
McMinnville College
Oregon Institute

References

External links
Santiam Academy in Lebanon, Oregon, 1936, Oregon Historic Photograph Collections, Salem Public Library
Guide to the Santiam Academy Student Manuscripts, 1865-1869

Defunct schools in Oregon
Education in Linn County, Oregon
Lebanon, Oregon
1852 establishments in Oregon Territory
1903 disestablishments in Oregon
Educational institutions disestablished in 1903
Educational institutions established in 1852
Demolished buildings and structures in Oregon
Buildings and structures demolished in 2002